Adet (Amharic: አዴት)  ,also known as Adet Medhanialem is a town in northwestern Ethiopia. It is the largest settlement in Yilmana Densa woreda.
Adet, Gojjam, Ethiopia

Geography
Adet is surrounded by two rivers, called Shenna and Shegize.

The southern part of Adet is called Felseta Mariam deber and Zerabruke (Anbesit Mewucha). The northern part is called Kurrastiyon or Ersha Mermer. The southwestern part is called Ereberbe Gabriel (Yegetoch Bahir zafe). The West of Adet is called Mender Eyesus, and the east Adet Hanna.

History
Records at the Nordic Africa Institute website provide details of the primary school in Adet in 1968. In January 1985, proposals were invited for the construction of an agricultural research station at Adet.

Demographics
Based on figures from the Central Statistical Agency in 2005, this town has an estimated total population of 21,117 of whom 10,508 are men and 10,609 are women. The 1994 census reported this town had a total population of 12,178 of whom 5,529 were men and 6,649 were women.

Notes 

Populated places in the Amhara Region